The Kalce Ridge is a  mountain of the Kamnik–Savinja Alps in northern Slovenia. It is the highest peak of the Krvavec Group.

Routes
 3½hrs from Gospinc Lodge through Long Field Pasture.
 4hrs from Gospinc Lodge, over Koren Peak.
 2½hrs from Zois Lodge at Kokra Saddle.

Views from the summit

References

External links
 
 The Kalce Ridge on summitpost.org 
 The Kalce Ridge on hribi.net Route Description and Photos (slo)

Mountains of the Alps
Kamnik–Savinja Alps
Mountains of Upper Carniola
Two-thousanders of Slovenia
Ridges of Slovenia